Caribou is one common name for the deer species Rangifer tarandus, also known as reindeer.

Caribou may also refer to:

Places

Canada
 Caribou, Nova Scotia, a rural community
 Caribou Island, an uninhabited island near the eastern end of Lake Superior
 Caribou Lake (Temagami), Ontario
 Caribou Lake (North Bay, Ontario)
 Caribou Mountains (Alberta)
 Caribou Mountain (Temagami), Ontario
 Caribou River (Rainy River District), Ontario
 Caribou River (Thunder Bay District), Ontario

United States
 Caribou, California, a census-designated place
 Caribou, Colorado, a ghost town
 Caribou, Maine, a city
 Caribou Township, Kittson County, Minnesota
 Caribou, Minnesota, an unincorporated community
 Caribou County, Idaho
 Caribou Mountains (Idaho)
 Caribou Mountain (Franklin County, Maine), on the Canada-United States border
 Caribou River (Minnesota)
 Caribou Wilderness, a federally-designated wilderness area in northern California

Transportation
 Caribou (train), formerly operated on the island of Newfoundland
 De Havilland Canada DHC-4 Caribou, a Canadian transport aircraft
 MV Caribou, a Canadian passenger-vehicle ferry named after SS Caribou
 SS Caribou, a Newfoundland passenger ferry torpedoed during World War II

Military
 Caribou, the export version of the Bell P-39 Airacobra fighter aircraft
 , a Royal Canadian Navy armed yacht that served in the Second World War
 CFAV Caribou (YAG 314), a 1950s Royal Canadian Navy vessel
 CFAV Caribou (PCT 57), a Royal Canadian Navy training and surveillance vessel launched in 2007
 Caribou Air Force Station, a defunct Air Force Station in Limestone, Maine, United States
 Battle of Caribou, an 1838 minor skirmish in the Aroostook War fought at Caribou, Maine

Music
 Caribou (musician), a stage name used by Dan Snaith
 Caribou Records, a defunct record label
 Caribou (album), a 1974 album by Elton John
 "Caribou", a song by Pixies from their first album Come On Pilgrim

Other uses
 Caribou, an early codename for what became Google's Gmail
 Caribou (drink), an alcoholic mixed drink popular in Quebec
 Caribou Biosciences, a biotech company
 Caribou Coffee, a chain of coffee shops
 Caribou Inuit, an Inuit group in Nunavut, Canada
 Caribou High School, Caribou, Maine, United States
 Caribou Manufacturing Company, original name of the Monaco Coach Corporation, an American recreational vehicle manufacturer
 Caribou Wind Park, New Brunswick, Canada, a wind farm
 Colorado Caribous, a 1978 soccer team from Denver, Colorado, United States
 Quebec Caribou, a former rugby union club based in Montreal, Quebec, Canada

See also 
 Cariboo (disambiguation)
 Carabao, a type of Southeast Asian water buffalo